House in the Woods is a solitaire card game.

House in the Woods may also refer to:

"House in the Woods," a song by Tom Petty from his 1994 album  Wildflowers
Huis ten Bosch palace in the Netherlands, translated and anglicized as "House in the Woods"
House in the Woods (album), an upcoming album by Low Roar